The 2018 D88.com European Masters was a professional ranking snooker tournament, that took place from 1 to 7 October 2018 in Lommel, Belgium. It was the fifth ranking event of the 2018/2019 season.

Qualifying took place on 17 and 18 August 2018 in Preston, England.

Judd Trump was the defending champion after winning the previous two events, but he lost 2–4 to Tian Pengfei in the second round.

Jimmy Robertson reached his first ever ranking event semi-final, which he converted into his first professional ranking event title, beating Joe Perry 9–6 in the final.

Prize fund
The breakdown of prize money for this year is shown below:

 Winner: £75,000
 Runner-up: £35,000
 Semi-final: £17,500
 Quarter-final: £11,000
 Last 16: £6,000
 Last 32: £4,000
 Last 64: £3,000

 Televised highest break: £1,500
 Total: £398,500

The "rolling 147 prize" for a maximum break: £10,000

Main draw

Final

Qualifying
These matches were held between 17 and 18 August 2018 at the Preston Guild Hall in Preston, England. All matches were best of 7 frames.

Notes

Century breaks

Main stage centuries
Total: 24

 135, 132, 108  Jimmy Robertson
 135, 104  Jack Lisowski
 130, 110, 106, 103  Joe Perry
 130  Zhao Xintong
 129  Anthony Hamilton
 124  Mark King
 117  Eden Sharav
 114  Judd Trump 
 112, 112  Tian Pengfei 
 112  Liang Wenbo
 110  Elliot Slessor
 109  Luca Brecel
 108  Zhang Anda
 107  Allan Taylor
 105  Ali Carter 
 104  Anthony McGill
 100  David Gilbert

Qualifying stage centuries
Total: 18

 142  Matthew Selt
 140, 100  Sam Craigie
 138  Elliot Slessor
 132, 123  Zhou Yuelong
 122  Adam Duffy
 121  Thepchaiya Un-Nooh
 119  Jack Lisowski
 118, 102  Mark Selby
 116  Ashley Carty
 106  Craig Steadman
 104  Peter Ebdon
 102  Anthony Hamilton
 102  Kishan Hirani
 100  Ryan Day

References

External links

2018
European Masters
European Masters
Snooker in Belgium
Lommel
European Masters